Burnmouth railway station served the village of Burnmouth, Ayton, Scotland from 1848 to 1962 on the East Coast Main Line.

History 
There is some confusion about when the station opened. Quick (2022) does note that the station was mentioned in a company timetable, effective from 17 February 1847, as a stop for the Wednesdays only Edinburgh cattle market goods train, which also carried passengers.

The original building for the station was a one-storey building on a T-plan, but it is now a private residence.

The station was host to a LNER camping coach in 1939.

The branch to Eyemouth closed on 5 February 1962 and Burnmouth station closed completely at the same time.

References

External links 
Burnmouth station on Railscot

Former North British Railway stations
Disused railway stations in the Scottish Borders
Railway stations in Great Britain opened in 1846
Railway stations in Great Britain closed in 1962